Tany may refer to:
 the Hungarian name of Tôň, a village and municipality in the Komárno District, Slovakia

 People
 Tany Youne (1903-1977), a soviet actress and writer
 Luke de Tany (died 1282), a high-ranking Norman lord
 Theaurau John Tany (c. 1608-1659), an English preacher and religious visionary
 William Tany (died after 1385), a Prior of the Hospitallers in Ireland
 Tany, the sister of Nehesy, a king in the late Hyksos period c. 1570 BCE.